Giuseppe Piermarini (18 July 1734 – 18 February 1808) was an Italian architect who trained with Luigi Vanvitelli in Rome and  designed the Teatro alla Scala in Milan (1776–78), which remains the work by which he is remembered. Indeed, "il Piermarini" serves as an occasional journalistic synonym for the celebrated opera house. Piermarini was appointed professor in the Academy of Fine Arts of Brera, better known as Brera Academy, Milan,  when it was formally founded in 1776.

Biography

Piermarini was born at Foligno, then part of the Papal States. He was Vanvitelli's collaborator at Caserta, 1765-1769, when he removed to Milan. From his Milan base he reorganized the University of Pavia (1770), for which he remodeled th Old Campus and built the greenhouses of the Botanical Garden, and the palazzo for the Accademia di Scienze e Belle Lettere, now Accademia Nazionale Virgiliana, at Mantua (1773), where he also designed the façade of the neighbouring Teatro Bibiena. He designed the interior of the Maria Teresa Hall of the Biblioteca Braidense in Milan

With the Habsburg decision permanently to install an archduke at Milan, Piermarini was commissioned to reconstruct the ducal palace adjoining the cathedral as an appropriate city residence and to construct a wholly new country seat near Monza.

For the Royal Palace of Milan, Piermarini successfully avoided competition with the rich Gothic front of the cathedral with his sober neoclassical façade (1773–80) and created the Piazzetta Reale, as part of his urbanistic projects in the city centre. For the Royal Villa of Monza, (1776 onwards), successive changes adapted the original pleasure villa to a seat of court. In 1779 Piermarini was officially named architect of the Imperial Kingdom, a position he had occupied in fact for several years.

Over the years successive internal reconstructions have altered the interior of the Teatro alla Scala, so that only Piermarini's general plan, and his facade, are what remain of his designs.

Piermarini's lesser works in Milan include the Palazzo Greppi (1772–78), the Palazzo Moriggia (1775), and the Palazzo Belgioioso (1772–81). At Parabiago, his friend the successful cabinetmaker Giuseppe Maggiolini commissioned him to erect a new façade for the Chiesa Prepositurale dei Santi Gervasio e Protasio (1780). He also designed the Villa Tittoni Traversi.

In 1798 he returned to his native Foligno, where he effected some changes in the Duomo and prepared a project for the Cappella del Sacramento in the church of San Lorenzo at Spello. Among his pupils was Giacomo Albertolli, the nephew of Piermarini's collaborator in stucco decoration of palaces, Giocondo Albertolli. Giacomo succeeded him as professor of architecture in the Brera Academy. He died in Foligno in 1808.

References

1734 births
1808 deaths
People from Foligno
18th-century Italian architects
Academic staff of Brera Academy
Giuseppe Piermarini buildings